Octoacanthella is a genus of springtails in the family Hypogastruridae. There is at least one described species in Octoacanthella, O. aethiopica.

References

Further reading

 
 
 

Collembola
Springtail genera